Claudia Müller (born 21 May 1974 in Bremen) is a German footballer who played as a striker. She scored 23 goals in 46 caps for the Germany national team between 1996 and 2001.

Müller played for Germany at the 1999 FIFA Women's World Cup finals and the 2000 Summer Olympics. In 2001, she was the leading goal-scorer at the UEFA Women's Euro 2001 securing Germany's third consecutive championship (and the fifth all-time).

International goals

References

External links
 

1974 births
Living people
German women's footballers
Germany women's international footballers
Footballers at the 2000 Summer Olympics
Olympic bronze medalists for Germany
Footballers from Bremen
Olympic medalists in football
Medalists at the 2000 Summer Olympics
Olympic footballers of Germany
UEFA Women's Championship-winning players
Women's association football forwards
1999 FIFA Women's World Cup players
VfL Wolfsburg (women) players